Radio Kakanj is a Bosnian local commercial radio station, broadcasting from Kakanj, Bosnia and Herzegovina. This radio station broadcasts a variety of programs such music and local news.

When war in Bosnia and Herzegovina started, Radio Kakanj was founded on 27 April 1992 as local/municipal public radio station. In 2000, radio station was re-registered in Communications Regulatory Agency of Bosnia and Herzegovina as private, commercial radio station.

Program is mainly produced in Bosnian language at one FM frequency (Kakanj ) and it is available in the city of Kakanj as well as in nearby municipalities in Zenica-Doboj Canton and Sarajevo Canton area.

Estimated number of listeners of Radio Kakanj is around 27.221. Radio Kakanj is also available via internet and via IPTV platform in BiH (Moja TV - Channel 240).

Frequencies
 Kakanj

See also 
 List of radio stations in Bosnia and Herzegovina
 Radio Visoko
 Radio Breza
 Radio Ilijaš
 Radio Zenica
 Radio Vogošća

References

External links 
 www.radiokakanj.co.ba
 www.radiostanica.ba
 www.fmscan.org
 Communications Regulatory Agency of Bosnia and Herzegovina

Kakanj
Radio stations established in 1992
Kakanj
1992 establishments in Bosnia and Herzegovina